Anheung is a launch site for sounding rockets in South Korea. It has been in use since 1993.

External links
 https://web.archive.org/web/20050416040800/http://www.astronautix.com/sites/anhueng.htm

Spaceports